Sanhe is a town of Beilin District, Suihua, Heilongjiang, People's Republic of China, located  northeast of downtown Suihua. , it has six villages under its administration.

See also
List of township-level divisions of Heilongjiang

References

Township-level divisions of Heilongjiang
Suihua